Critical Role Productions, LLC is a multimedia production company incorporated in 2015 by the members of the creator-owned streaming show Critical Role. The first two shows from the company, Critical Role and Talks Machina, originally premiered on Geek & Sundry. The company moved to their own studio space in 2018, and began putting out new shows on their own Twitch and YouTube channels. A split from Legendary Digital Networks was completed in early 2019, at which point Critical Role Productions took over production responsibility and since then has continued to launch new shows independently.

Critical Role Productions uses several trade names for various forms of media production such as the gaming imprint Darrington Press, the record label Scanlan Shorthalt Music, and the film and television production banner Metapigeon. They also launched a 501(c)(3) nonprofit organization, Critical Role Foundation, in 2020 to manage various charity projects by the company. In 2023, Critical Role Productions signed a film and television first-look deal with Amazon Studios.

History

Geek & Sundry era (2015–19) 
Critical Role Productions was founded by the members of the creator-owned D&D streaming show Critical Role in 2015. The group had originally begun playing at home in 2012. Felicia Day approached the group about playing it in a live-streamed format for Geek & Sundry, after hearing about the group's private tabletop role-playing game from Ashley Johnson. In order to streamline gameplay for the show, the game's characters were converted from Pathfinder to Dungeons & Dragons 5th edition before the web series began airing on March 12, 2015. The company's first show, Critical Role, was a huge success. The company's second show, Talks Machina, then premiered on Geek & Sundry and Alpha, Legendary Digital Networks' subscription streaming service, in 2016.

In June 2018, Critical Role launched its own Twitch and YouTube channels, with cast member Marisha Ray being announced as the creative director of the franchise. Critical Role then started to self-produce new shows and content which did not air on Geek & Sundry's channels. The sets for Critical Role and Talks Machina moved from Legendary Digital Network's studios to Critical Role's own studios in July 2018. 

The eight founders—the cast members of Critical Role itself―"own equity stakes in the company".
, Travis Willingham serves as chief executive officer, Matthew Mercer as chief creative officer, and Marisha Ray as creative director. Several senior Legendary Digital staff members joined Critical Role during the split, with head of digital strategy and operations Ed Lopez becoming chief operating officer, vice president of marketing Rachel Romero becoming senior vice president of marketing at Critical Role, and Ben Van Der Fluit becoming senior vice president of business development.

Independent studio (2019–present)
Critical Role's split from Geek & Sundry and Legendary Digital Networks completed in February 2019. From this point Critical Role took over production responsibility of the Critical Role and Talks Machina shows, with live broadcasts of their shows and the video on demand (VOD) now airing exclusively on Critical Role's own channels. The disengagement from Legendary's streaming service Alpha would cancel Talks Machina: After Dark, which had been exclusive to the service. Some "legacy episodes" (currently the entirety of Campaign 1, the first 19 episodes of Campaign 2, as well as the corresponding episodes of official discussion show Talks Machina) remain available in Geek & Sundry's archives on YouTube and Twitch. Beginning in December 2019, some older content was migrated from Geek & Sundry to Critical Role's channels.

On March 4, 2019, Critical Role launched a Kickstarter campaign to raise funds for a 22-minute animation called Critical Role: The Legend of Vox Machina Animated Special. The final total raised by the Kickstarter when it closed on April 19, 2019, was $11.3M turning the intended animated special into a ten episode animated series. When the campaign closed, it was one of the most quickly funded in Kickstarter history, and was the most funded Kickstarter for TV and film projects. In November 2019, Amazon Prime Video announced that they had acquired the streaming rights to The Legend of Vox Machina, and had commissioned 14 additional episodes (two additional episodes for season 1 and a second season of 12 episodes). The project was originally slated for release in late 2020, however the COVID-19 pandemic delayed release until 2022.

In September 2019, Critical Role announced it had "entered into licensing agreements with Funko, McFarlane Toys, Penguin Random House, and Ripple Junction" to produce merchandise such as apparel and collectibles. Critical Role aired a sponsored one-shot using the Feast of Legends RPG system—developed by fast-food chain Wendy's—on October 3, 2019. Following a strong negative response from some Critical Role fans the Critical Role team removed the VOD, and announced via Twitter that they had donated their profits from the sponsorship. Shelly Jones, in an essay in the book Watch Us Roll (2021), commented that decision was "presumably" made by the show's "development team for purposes of branding and controlling the criticism circulating about the failed experiment". In the first half of 2020, a claim was made online that Critical Role had retained the services of a sensitivity reader but had not paid the individual. As a result, the company called in an outside counsel to investigate the claims. Whilst the investigation concluded the claims in Critical Role's favor; the person who made the original claim tweeted that they had not been contacted during the investigation.

The coronavirus pandemic caused major scheduling changes for Critical Role Productions beginning in March 2020. This included a four month hiatus for Critical Role itself, the launch of new remote format shows such as Narrative Telephone, and new remote formats for other shows including Talks Machina. A number of other shows were placed on hiatus, including Pub Draw, Mame Drop and All Work No Play. Darrington Press, a "new board and card game publishing brand", was announced by Critical Role in October 2020. In August 2021, Brian W. Foster, host of Talks Machina and other shows, left the company to pursue other "creative endeavors", a move which effectively ended Talks Machina and Between the Sheets, the latter of which had been on hiatus since the pandemic. Critical Role returned to the pre-pandemic common table format with the launch of Campaign Three in October 2021, while a new aftershow launched in 2022 in the form of 4-Sided Dive.

A leak of Twitch data in October 2021 revealed that Critical Role is among the highest earners on Twitch; the company received a total direct payout of $9,626,712 between September 2019 and September 2021 from Twitch in gross income from subscriptions and ad revenue. BBC News commented that this list of payments is unlikely to "account for tax paid on income" and that "many, if not all, of these top streamers are effectively large-scale media operations, with their own employees and business expenses - so the numbers do not represent 'take-home pay' for those listed". Business Insider highlighted that  "Critical Role has grown into a full-fledged media company. [...] Its LinkedIn page lists employees in roles including marketing, business development, photography, editing, and even one person responsible for keeping track of the lore, or details in its fantasy world". Variety reported that, the company has expanded to "about 40 employees (including the eight founders)" and it "has received no funding from outside investors".

In June 2022, Critical Role launched a new record label, Scanlan Shorthalt Music, to release original music inspired by Critical Role and the Exandria setting. Along with the label announcement, they released their first album titled Welcome to Tal'Dorei. The new project is led by Ray and Senior Producer Maxwell James.

In January 2023, it was announced that Critical Role Productions had signed a first-look deal with Amazon Studios to create film and television series, while also announcing an animated series based on the Mighty Nein campaign. Variety reported that "under the deal with Amazon Studios, Critical Role will continue to produce under its production banner, Metapigeon".

Productions 
The company produces and broadcasts the following shows from its Burbank Studio location:

Current programming

Critical Role and podcast (2015) 

Critical Role is the "main series" of the studio. The series is broadcast on Thursdays at 19:00 PT on the Critical Role Twitch and YouTube channels, with the VOD being available to Twitch subscribers immediately after the broadcast. The VODs are made available for the public via the YouTube channel on the Monday after the live stream. As part of social distancing requirements during the COVID-19 pandemic the show has switched to a pre-recorded format. The show's third campaign premiered on October 21, 2021.

Crit Recap Animated (2020)  
An animated spinoff of Critical Recap hosted by Dani Carr. Crit Recap Animated is co-written by Carr, Kyle Shire and Marisha Ray with animation by Offworld Studios. The show retells Campaign 2 story arcs in short, 5- to 10-minute episodes. Episode 1 premiered in December 2020 and introduced the main characters of the Mighty Nein. The show completed Campaign 2 in August 2022.

#EverythingIsContent (2018) 
A show of no fixed format. Several #EverythingIsContent episodes have had sponsored content. The show can be something of a testbed for the studio too; with Pub Draw and MAME Drop originally piloted as episodes of #EverythingIsContent.

Exandria Unlimited (ExU) (2021) 

An anthology web series and spin-off of Critical Role. The first season of ExU featured a canon Critical Role story set in the city of Emon on the continent of Tal'Dorei 30 years after Campaign One and 10 years after Campaign Two. Helmed by Aabria Iyengar as the Dungeon Master, it was originally broadcast from June 24 to August 12, 2021 with a two-part continuation released at the end of March 2022. The second season, titled Exandria Unlimited: Calamity, premiered on May 26, 2022. It follows a group of heroes from the Age of Arcanum who attempt to prevent the Calamity and is led by Brennan Lee Mulligan as the Dungeon Master.

4-Sided Dive (2022)  
Four Critical Role cast members answer fan submitted questions "pulled from a Tower of Inquiry, which is basically a Jenga tower". The host is randomly selected by the roll of a d20 die. 4-Sided Dive replaced Talks Machina.

The Legend of Vox Machina (2022) 

The animated series based on events in campaign one. The first ten episodes of season one were financed through a Kickstarter campaign, with Amazon picking up distribution and green-lighting an additional 14 episodes (two additional episodes for the first season and a 12 episode second season). The COVID-19 pandemic delayed the release schedule from Fall 2020; it premiered on January 28, 2022. In October 2022, Amazon renewed the series for a third season, ahead of the second season's premiere on January 20, 2023.

Future programing

Mighty Nein 
In January 2023, it was announced that the second campaign will receive an animated television adaptation for Amazon Prime Video titled Mighty Nein. The series will be executive produced by Tasha Huo, Sam Riegel, Travis Willingham, Chris Prynoski, Shannon Prynoski, Antonio Canobbio and Ben Kalina; Metapigeon, Amazon Studios, and Titmouse will serve as the production companies.

On hiatus

All Work No Play and podcast (2018–2020) 
Liam O'Brien and Sam Riegel catch up over a drink and try a new activity each episode. The show was developed from Liam and Sam's original AWNP podcast (2012–2017), which predates the home game that would become Critical Role. Season one aired in 2018 and season two aired in 2020.

Critter Hug (2020–2021) 
A to-camera show starring Mica Burton and Matt Mercer. The hosts introduce and talk around topics relevant to the "Critter" community. Only the first episode of the show was aired before California's COVID-19 pandemic lockdown measures began. Two further episodes were broadcast in 2021.

MAME Drop (2019) 
Taliesin Jaffe and guest(s) play old-school arcade games on the studio's MAME cabinet.

Mini Primetime (2019–2020) 
A show hosted by Will Friedle on how to improve painting techniques, specifically for Dungeons & Dragons miniatures. Season one aired in 2019, and was followed by a 2020 special under Talks Machina's "After Dark" branding.

Mighty Vibes (2020–2021) 
A playlist of songs curated to the aesthetic of one, or more, of the members of the Mighty Nein and Vox Machina. Songs play over a looped animation featuring said member. Sound clips recorded by the players of the featured character or characters are interspersed throughout the playlist.

Narrative Telephone (2020–2021) 
The Critical Role cast and guests play a socially distanced version of Telephone using pre-recorded video messages.

Pub Draw (2019) 
Marisha Ray is taught how to improve her drawing by comic book artist, and Critter, Babs Tarr. Seasons one and two aired in 2019.

Former programming

AWNP: Unplugged (2020)  
Sam Riegel and Liam O'Brien catch-up via video chat during the COVID-19 pandemic. Each episode after the first has also featured another Critical Role cast member, or a friend of the cast, as a guest (also joining via video chat). Andy Wilson, for Bleeding Cool, highlighted the show as "a Zoom chat between friends, mostly about their dogs, their kids, and how they were dealing with the lockdown, and how much they missed each other. It was an exercise in human connection, and it was so beautifully simple. It also garnered hundreds of thousands of views every week".

Between the Sheets (2018–2019)  
Brian W. Foster interviews a different guest each episode. Non-Critical Role guests included Logic and Amanda Palmer. Season one aired in 2018 and season two aired in 2019. Season 3 was scheduled to premiere on August 5, 2020, however, the show's production went on un-planned hiatus due to the COVID-19 pandemic in March 2020 and then Foster left the company in 2021.

Critical Recap (2018-2019)  
A look back on previous episodes of Critical Role hosted by Dani Carr, production coordinator for Critical Role. Starting with Episode 11 of Campaign two, Critical Recap aired on the Geek & Sundry Twitch channel before the Critical Role live stream on Thursdays. After Critical Role's split from Geek & Sundry, new episodes of Critical Recap premiered on Critical Role's YouTube channel every Tuesday, while a rebroadcast aired on the Critical Role Twitch channel immediately before the Critical Role live stream on Thursdays. On YouTube, "as a standalone stream", the show had "roughly 20-50,000 views per recap". The video format for Critical Recap was last used for episode 88 of Campaign two. Beginning 2020, the show was replaced by a written recap made available on the Critical Role website. An animated version of the show was launched in December 2020.

Handbooker Helper (2018-2020)  
A series of introductory to-camera videos on the different elements of Dungeons and Dragons hosted by different members of the Critical Role cast. The show's name is a parody of Hamburger Helper and a reference to the Player's Handbook. Though not a requirement to watch, the Critical Role campaigns are often alluded to through inside jokes and other meta-references. A total of 42 episodes of Handbooker Helper were released before the series concluded in June 2019. In preparation for a Valentine's Day one-shot, an episode of Handbooker Helper explaining the basics of the Monsterhearts 2 role-playing game was released February 6, 2020.

UnDeadwood (2019)  
A four-part limited series in which Brian W. Foster GMs a game based on the HBO series Deadwood, using the Deadlands RPG system.

Talks Machina and podcast (2016-2021) 
An aftershow hosted by Brian W. Foster, in which he and a few cast members discussed the most recent installment of Critical Role. The show aired live on Twitch at 18:45 PT on Tuesdays. In its original format, the cast answered fan questions on in-game events, decisions, or character development. Weekly competitions were held for fan content, with prizes for the winners, such as "fan art of the week" and "cosplay of the week". The winners were announced in interlude segments. Originally, the first 100 episodes of Talks Machina were broadcast on Geek & Sundry's channels. Beginning in February 2019, as part of Critical Role's split from Geek & Sundry, new episodes began airing on the Critical Role Twitch channel. The VODs were available to Twitch subscribers immediately after the initial broadcast, and were also uploaded to YouTube on the following Thursday. Beginning in December 2019, as part of the migration of older content to the Critical Role channels, some episodes of Talks Machina were deleted from Geek & Sundry's channels and re-uploaded to the official Critical Role channels. The show was on hiatus from March to September 2020 due to the COVID-19 pandemic. It returned in a biweekly, remote pre-recorded format until its cancelation shortly before the end of Campaign Two. YouTube views hovered "around 130-190,000 – or roughly 25 percent of the views of the [Critical Role] VOD itself".

Talks Machina: After Dark (2017-2019)  
"An extended after show for our after show", which would air exclusively on Alpha shortly after the conclusion of Talks Machina each week. The cast would respond to questions directly from the chat. The show ended its run after Critical Role split from Legendary and disengaged from Alpha. It was announced that the After Dark suspension was temporary, though the show never returned. The After Dark branding was later applied to a Mini Primetime special in 2020.

Travis Willingham's Yeehaw Game Ranch (2019) 
Travis Willingham and Brian W. Foster play video games.

Yee-Haw Off the Ranch (2020) 
An at home version of Travis Willingham's Yeehaw Game Ranch starring Ashley Johnson and Brian W. Foster during the COVID-19 pandemic.

Broadcast 
Critical Role Productions primarily broadcasts on the Critical Role Twitch and YouTube channels. This includes both livestreaming and VOD. A number of shows formerly broadcast on Legendary's Alpha service from 2017-19.

Podcasts 
The Critical Role podcast was announced during the 100th episode of the first campaign. It is an audio version of the game sessions. As well as the Critical Role website, the podcast is available on iTunes, Google Play Music, and Spotify. 

The first campaign's podcast episodes were released in batches of 10–15, between June 8, 2017 and January 8, 2018. "Listened to at 1.5X speed, total listening time of the first campaign would be reduced to a little over 298 hours – at 2X speed, under 224 hours". The podcast episodes for the second campaign have been released on the Thursday after the episode streamed on Twitch. "Fans often recommend that a listener supplement their experience with strategic viewing of notable visual moments".

Talks Machina was also released in a podcast format from episode 101 until its conclusion. Like the podcast version of Critical Role; there was a week's delay between the broadcast of Talks Machina on Twitch, and the corresponding podcast episode's release.

Licensed works and related products 

Critical Role's commercial success has led to many other related products, including a prequel comic series Critical Role: Vox Machina Origins, art books, a novel Kith &  Kin, two campaign setting books (Critical Role: Tal'Dorei Campaign Setting and Explorer's Guide to Wildemount), and an animated series. Hobby and toy stores sell miniatures and other collectibles related to Critical Role.

Reception 
In March 2020, CNBC reported that "since amicably parting ways with Geek & Sundry in 2018, Critical Role has become its own media company, with hundreds of thousands of subscribers across several social media platforms, and more than 120 million views on YouTube. [...] Critical Role has offered a diverse line-up of D&D games. There's the long-form fantasy campaign that the whole group participates in weekly and then there are shorter-form series like 'Undeadwood,' a western themed game, that may interest the same fan base, or entice new viewers who are more interested in that genre".

By January 2021, Critical Role had 220 million views across the channel with 44,000 paid subscribers on Twitch that month and the first episode of Campaign One had been watched 15 million times on YouTube. During the last 10 months of Campaign Two, between August 2020 and May 2021, Twitch subscriptions averaged around 27,000 paid subscribers. Business Insider reported, before the premiere of Campaign Three in October 2021, that the official Twitch channel had 828,000 followers and 13,530 active subscribers while the official YouTube channel had 1.4 million subscribers. Variety reported "historically, C.R.'s Twitch channel has attracted 60,000-75,000 live viewers for each episode. Factoring in on-demand plays on Twitch and YouTube, the total per-episode audience has ranged from 1.2 million to 1.5 million, according to Willingham. In the past 12 months, the audience has grown more than 23% on Twitch and nearly 50% on YouTube year over year. That said, Critical Role remains relatively small compared with other popular creators and digital media properties: It has 818,000 followers on Twitch (the platform's most popular streamers have 10 million or more)".

Emily Friedman, in the book Roleplaying Games in the Digital Age: Essays on Transmedia Storytelling, Tabletop RPGs and Fandom (2021), highlighted that "while Talks Machina offers the potential for additional narrative details, its chief appeal is how it creates an informal, even chaotic space for the players within the social frame, and is a mediated space where fans are names and their labor showcased through the intermediaries of Foster and Carr, who are not players but viewers of the show, and who have become beloved in their own right. Other livestreams (Game Ranch, MAME Drop) have subsequently leaned into this parasocial pleasure, allowing for more time 'with' the cast".

On January 5, 2023, Linda Codega reported that io9 had received a leaked copy of the Open Game License 1.1 (OGL1.1). Both the Critical Role: Tal'Dorei Campaign Setting sourcebook and its updated edition, Tal'Dorei Campaign Setting Reborn, were published under the original OGL, which has allowed a wide range of unofficial commercial derivative work based on the mechanics of Dungeons and Dragons to be produced since 2000. The language reportedly within OGL1.1 would revoke the original OGL and would be much more restrictive to third party content creators. Critical Role's official statement made no mention of the OGL; instead it spoke to Critical Role's support of the tabletop game community, and that Critical Role is where it is because of that community. The statement also mentioned "stand[ing] by" developers of "new [TTRPG] system[s]". While some were disappointed by the statement, others thought it was a legally shrewd statement. ICv2 commented that "Critical Role likely needed to walk a fine line between not criticizing one of their biggest sponsors (WotC/D&D Beyond) while, at the same time, quelling their fan base's simmering outrage. Their company was clearly stuck between a proverbial 'rock and a hard place,' as backing one party over any of the others in this conflict could potentially be a detrimental financial decision for them". In the ComicBook.com podcast The Character Sheet, Christian Hoffer speculated that Critical Role could be under contract to use the 5th edition system for the remainder of Campaign 3, and that there might be "non-disparity clauses" preventing them from speaking out against Hasbro, its subsidiaries, and its products. In an interview with Codega, Ray stated "it's important to have an environment that does allow these creators; independent, big, small, to create and make new things. Whichever way allows the community to do that, that's where we're going to stand and support". On the draft OGL1.2 separating some Dungeons & Dragons content into a Creative Commons license, Mercer stated it was "a grandiose step in a grandiose direction. And I am very eager to see where it goes from here".

On Critical Role's eighth anniversary, Christian Hoffer of ComicBook.com highlighted the growth of the brand and stated it is "a Hollywood success story unlike any other. And perhaps the most fascinating part is that it seems like their story is just beginning. In addition to flagship show and portfolio of current and upcoming animated projects, Critical Role has also released soundtracks, an impressive array of merchandise, and a bevy of spin-off shows that periodically air on the channel. The business of Critical Role (led by Willingham and Ray, who are CEO and creative director, respectively) moves very deliberately, but they have yet to discover a ceiling for just how big the Critical Role empire can grow".

Accolades 
The Critical Role channel has won the following awards:

Charity involvement 
Critical Role Productions and Stephen Colbert teamed up for Red Nose Day for a special one-on-one adventure with Matthew Mercer as Dungeon Master that aired on May 23, 2019. Fans were able to donate to the cause and vote for elements of the adventure such as Colbert's companion, his class, his legendary weapon, and the villain. In the one-shot campaign, Colbert played a half-elf bard named Capo, and had a bee named Eric as a companion. The event raised $117,176.20 for the charity.

Critical Role Foundation 

Critical Role Productions launched a new 501(c)(3) nonprofit organization, Critical Role Foundation, in September 2020 with the mission statement: "to leave the world better than we found it". Ashley Johnson has been named president of the organization with Matthew Mercer, Eduardo Lopez, Rachel Romero, and Mark Koro as officers and board members. Critical Role Foundation states that 85% of donation funds will go to partner non-profits, 10% will be allocated into an emergency fund, and 5% will be allocated to administrative fees and operating expenses. The emergency fund will allow the foundation "to donate funds in the event of natural disasters and other unforeseen events that require immediate humanitarian assistance". CBR reported that "Critical Role Foundation will partner with other organizations in the nonprofit sector that share the same values as Critical Role and its community, in addition to raising emergency relief funds to be put toward immediate humanitarian aid as needed". 

In an interview, Johnson said "We've worked with a handful of nonprofits over the years that focus on causes that Critical Role and the community care most about. These charities include 826LA, Red Nose Day, OSD, Pablove and OutRight International, and since we began streaming in 2015, the Critical Role community has raised well over half a million dollars for these organizations. [...] We wanted to go the 501(c)(3) route so that donors are able to do tax-deductible donations. [...] CRF is definitely going to have a presence within the wider Critical Role world, but it's going to act as a separate entity tied to the main one".

In 2022, the Critical Role Foundation was nominated for two Shorty Impact Awards – "Best Fundraising Campaign" and "Best Influencer & Celebrity Partnership" – for its Red Nose Day campaign with Colbert titled "Choose Stephen's Adventure… Again!". This campaign "raised over $423K for Red Nose Day" which is a "252% increase over the 2019" campaign.

Reference section 

2015 establishments in California
Entertainment companies based in California
Podcasting companies
Role-playing game publishing companies
Twitch (service)
YouTube channels
YouTube channels launched in 2018
Webcasters